Gabungan Sepakbola Palopo 1958 (simply known as Gaspa 1958) is an Indonesian football club based in Palopo, South Sulawesi. They currently compete in the Liga 3.

Honours
 Liga 3 South Sulawesi
 Runner-up: 2019

References

External links
Gaspa Palopo Liga-Indonesia.co.id

Football clubs in Indonesia
Football clubs in South Sulawesi
Association football clubs established in 1958
1958 establishments in Indonesia